Pietriș River may refer to the following rivers in Romania:

 Pietriș, a tributary of the Coșna in Suceava County
 Pietriș, a tributary of the Tinoasa in Teleorman County
 Pietriș, a tributary of the Mureș in Mureș County